Highland Meadows is a neighborhood in Dallas, Texas, United States.

The area is located along the easternmost edge of the Lake Highlands community. The community has 1,390 houses bordered by Walnut Hill/LBJ Freeway to the north, Jupiter Road to the east, Plano Road on the west, and Northwest Highway to the south.

The oldest subdivisions opened in the 1950s; the newest subdivision, Haven Creek Court, opened in 2003.

Government
The community is located within two city council districts, 9 and 10.

Education
Two school districts serve Highland Meadows.

Dallas Independent School District residents are served by:
 Highland Meadows Elementary School
 Sam Tasby Middle School
 Emmett J. Conrad High School

Richardson Independent School District residents are served by:
 Wallace Elementary School
 Lake Highlands Junior High School
 Lake Highlands High School

References

External links
Highland Meadows Neighborhood Association
Lakehighlands Area Improvement Association

Neighborhoods in Lake Highlands, Dallas